The LPGA KEB HanaBank Championship was a women's professional golf tournament in Incheon, South Korea, co-sanctioned by the LPGA of Korea Tour and the LPGA Tour.

Until 2013, it was a 54-hole event with a limited field of 78 players, approximately half of a full-field event. There was no cut; all players played all three rounds. However, the LPGA Tour imposed a points cut to the top 40 players (and ties) for purposes of championship points towards the CME Globe. In 2014, the event became a 72-hole event, and again only has a symbolic cut of 40 players at the end of the tournament for CME Globe purposes.

Tournament names
2001–2002: Sports Today CJ Nine Bridges Classic
2003–2005: CJ Nine Bridges Classic presented by Sports Today
2006: KOLON-Hana Bank Championship
2007–2009: Hana Bank-KOLON Championship
2010–2011: LPGA Hana Bank Championship Presented by SK Telecom
2012–2014: LPGA KEB-HanaBank Championship
2015–2018: LPGA KEB Hana Bank Championship

Winners

*Tournament was shortened to 36 holes in 2007 due to unplayable course conditions.
**Tournament went to a playoff.

Tournament record

External links

LPGA.com official microsite
Sky72 Golf Club

Former LPGA Tour events
LPGA of Korea Tour events
Golf tournaments in South Korea
Autumn events in South Korea
Recurring sporting events established in 2001
Recurring sporting events disestablished in 2018
2001 establishments in South Korea
2018 disestablishments in South Korea
Women's sport in South Korea